Asere may refer to:

Places
Asere, a quarter in Accra, Ghana
Asere, a village in Ogun State, Nigeria
Asere, a village in Ondo State, Nigeria

Other uses
Asere, 1995 album by Willy Chirino
Asere, a music group which collaborated with Billy Cobham
Emmanuel Asere (b. 1973), Ghanaian footballer at the 1989 FIFA U-16 World Championship